Big Wells is a city in Dimmit County, Texas, United States. The population was 697 at the 2010 census, with an estimated population of 712 in 2018.

Geography

Big Wells is located in northeastern Dimmit County at  (28.570970, –99.570399). Texas State Highway 85 passes through the community, leading east  to Dilley and Interstate 35, and west  to Carrizo Springs, the Dimmit County seat.

Demographics

2020 census

As of the 2020 United States census, there were 483 people, 256 households, and 154 families residing in the city.

2000 census
As of the census of 2000, there were 704 people, 244 households, and 182 families residing in the city. The population density was 1,268.1 people per square mile (485.4/km2). There were 302 housing units at an average density of 544.0 per square mile (208.2/km2). The racial makeup of the city was 79.26% White, 0.28% African American, 1.85% Native American, 0.43% Asian, 15.48% from other races, and 2.70% from two or more races. Hispanic or Latino of any race were 89.63% of the population.

There were 244 households, out of which 31.1% had children under the age of 18 living with them, 51.2% were married couples living together, 18.0% had a female householder with no husband present, and 25.4% were non-families. 23.0% of all households were made up of individuals, and 12.7% had someone living alone who was 65 years of age or older. The average household size was 2.87 and the average family size was 3.32.

In the city, the population was spread out, with 30.7% under the age of 18, 5.8% from 18 to 24, 20.9% from 25 to 44, 26.1% from 45 to 64, and 16.5% who were 65 years of age or older. The median age was 40 years. For every 100 females, there were 89.8 males. For every 100 females age 18 and over, there were 86.3 males.

The median income for a household in the city was $15,208, and the median income for a family was $17,381. Males had a median income of $13,750 versus $12,344 for females. The per capita income for the city was $6,594. About 38.3% of families and 43.6% of the population were below the poverty line, including 55.7% of those under age 18 and 33.0% of those age 65 or over.

Education 

The city is served by the Carrizo Springs Consolidated Independent School District.

Big Wells is served by:
 Big Wells Elementary School (PreK–2)
 Carrizo Springs Elementary (3–6)
 Carrizo Springs Junior High School (7–8)
 Carrizo Springs High School (9–12)

References

External links
 Big Wells at Handbook of Texas Online article
 Big Wells History at HistoricTexas.net

Cities in Texas
Cities in Dimmit County, Texas